Juszkowo is a non-operational railway station in Juszkowo (Pomeranian Voivodeship), Poland.

Lines crossing the station

References 
Juszkowo article at Polish stations database, URL accessed at 17 March 2006

Railway stations in Pomeranian Voivodeship
Disused railway stations in Pomeranian Voivodeship
Gdańsk County